Sundborg is a Scandinavian surname. Notable people with the surname include:

Åke Sundborg (1921–2007), Swedish geomorphologist
Stephen Sundborg (born 1943), American Jesuit and theologian
Solveig Sundborg (1910–2002), Danish film actress

Swedish-language surnames